LinguaLeo is an English language learning platform for Russian, Turkish, and Brazilian Portuguese speakers. As of September 2020, it reported 23 million users. LinguaLeo is available on the web, as Android, iOS, Windows Phone apps, and as a browser extension.

Mechanics 

The app assesses the user's language skills through a test and provides a personalized training program with grammar exercises and lessons to expand the vocabulary and improve  understanding of written texts and spoken language. The app library includes over 200,000 real-world materials to study: media articles, news, TED Talks, songs, videos, stories, and jokes. To additionally motivate the users, LinguaLeo adds gamification mechanics through interaction with the app's mascot Leo the Lion.

LinguaLeo is available as an Android, iOS, Windows Phone, and web applications, and a browser extension. The data is synchronized across all devices. A paid subscription provides access to extra courses, tutorials, interactive trainings, and allows to add unlimited number of words to the personal dictionary.

History 

LinguaLeo was launched as a web application in March 2010 by Russian entrepreneur Aynur Abdulnasurov and his four-person development team. The initial investments totaled $120,000. In November 2010, the startup raised $200,000 in seed money from private investors. From May to November 2021, LinguaLeo userbase grew from 90,000 to 500,000 users. It was considered one of the most prominent Russian startups and won a Russian Venture Company competition in 2011. By late 201, LinguaLeo reached the breakeven point.

In 2012, LinguaLeo released its iOS, Android, and Windows Phone apps and reached 1,5 mil users. It also received a $3 million investment from Runa Capital. In December 2012, the company was rated first in the Russian Startup Rating. In 2013, the company expanded to the Brazilian market. In Q4 2013, it reported 7 million users worldwide. The Next Web named LinguaLeo the best Russian startup of 2013, and Microsoft named it the best Windows Phone app of 2014.

See also

 Language education
 Computer-assisted language learning
 List of Language Self-Study Programs

References

External links
 
 Android app
 iOS app
 WindowsPhone app

Educational websites
Internet properties established in 2010
Social networking language-learning websites
Android (operating system) software
IOS software
Windows Phone software